Tormore distillery is a Speyside single malt Scotch whisky distillery located approximately 1 km south of the River Spey. Its water source is the Achvochkie Burn.

History 
The Tormore is one of the younger Scottish whiskies, the distillery construction began in 1958 and was completed in 1960. It was the first new distillery to be built in the country in the 20th century.

Designed by Alexander Cullen with input from Sir Albert Richardson for Long John International, it is a listed building, and one of the most architecturally striking distilleries. The building is made of granite, has copper rotors and a clock which plays four different Scottish songs each quarter of an hour. A village of workers houses were built in the same style, which was up for sale in its entirety in 2004, for offers over £550,000. The topiary hedges in the garden are also clipped to the shape of a bell or still.

In 1972, the distillery was expanded from four to eight stills. These were converted to be heated by wood chips  in 1984, a by-product of area's forestry. Long John was absorbed by Whitbread & Co in 1975, and the distillery was acquired by Allied Distillers Ltd the same year. The Tormore distillery has been controlled by Pernod-Ricard since they purchased Allied Domecq in 2005 and until it was sold to Elixir Distillers in 2022.

A time capsule in the shape of a pot-still is buried in the forecourt, which is intended to be opened in 2060. It contains glasses and a tregnum of Long John, the original owners’ own blended whisky.

Bottlings
Tormore's malt whisky is currently sold in 14 and 16 year aged versions. There are also independent bottlings from Signatory Vintage, Cadenhead's, Blackadder, That Boutique-y Whisky Company, Douglas Laing's Xtra Old Particular and Provenance. The whisky is described as "A smooth, nutty whisky which sometimes has a pear-like or melony character" by Royal Mile Whiskies.

See also
 Whisky
 Scotch whisky
 List of whisky brands
 List of distilleries in Scotland

References

External links
 Whisky Distilleries Info

Distilleries in Scotland
Scottish malt whisky
1960 establishments in Scotland
Food and drink companies established in 1960
Pernod Ricard brands